The 2019 FC Kyzylzhar season is the club's 12th season in the Kazakhstan Premier League, the highest tier of association football in Kazakhstan, and first since their relegation at the end of the 2009 season. Kyzylzhar will also play in the Kazakhstan Cup.

Squad

Transfers

Winter

In:

Out:

Summer

In:

Out:

Competitions

Premier League

Results summary

Results by round

Results

League table

Kazakhstan Cup

Squad statistics

Appearances and goals

|-
|colspan="14"|Players away from Kyzylzhar on loan:
|-
|colspan="14"|Players who left Kyzylzhar during the season:

|}

Goal scorers

Disciplinary record

References

External links

FC Kyzylzhar seasons
Kyzylzhar